In engineering, performance curve may refer to:
 Load testing curve, in software testing.
 Thrust curve, in rocketry.